Streli Mamba (born 17 June 1994) is a German professional footballer who plays for Chinese Super League club Dalian Pro as a forward.

Club career
Ahead of the 2019–20 season, Mamba joined Bundesliga club SC Paderborn 07 on a three-year contract. In September 2020, a move to 1. FC Köln failed due to a muscle injury detected during Mamba's medical examination. Both clubs had already agreed a transfer fee following protracted negotiations.

On 19 January 2021, Mamba signed with Kazakhstan Premier League club Kairat until 31 December 2022. On 14 June 2021, after scoring 2 goals in 13 appearances in all competitions for Kairat, Mamba joined Hansa Rostock on a year-long loan deal with the option to make the move permanent. On 11 July 2022, Kairat announced that Mamba had left the club after his contract was terminated by mutual agreement.

On 21 August 2022, Mamba joined Chinese Super League club Dalian Pro.

Personal life
Born in Germany, Mamba is of Congolese descent.

References

External links
 
 Profile at kicker.de

1994 births
Living people
People from Göppingen
Sportspeople from Stuttgart (region)
Footballers from Baden-Württemberg
German footballers
German sportspeople of Democratic Republic of the Congo descent
Association football forwards
FC 08 Homburg players
Stuttgarter Kickers players
FC Energie Cottbus players
SC Paderborn 07 players
FC Kairat players
Dalian Professional F.C. players
3. Liga players
Regionalliga players
Bundesliga players
Kazakhstan Premier League players
Chinese Super League players
German expatriate sportspeople in Kazakhstan
Expatriate footballers in Kazakhstan
German expatriate sportspeople in China
Expatriate footballers in China